Elisabeth Duda (born 1979) is a Polish film and television actress, writer.

Early life 
Duda was born in France. Her father is from France, and her mother is Polish.

Filmography 
 2002: Dwie kawy
 2003 – 2008 : Europa da się lubić
 2006: Bezład
 2008: Taniec z gwiazdami
 2008: Niania as Jacqueline
 2008: Agentki as Celine
 2008: Projekt plaża
 2009: Goście, goście w TVN Warszawa
 2011: Celles qui aimaient Richard Wagner as Cosima Wagner
 2011: Śladami Marii Skłodowskiej-Curie as Maria Skłodowska-Curie
 2013: Run Boy Run
 2017: Coexister
 2018: Dilili in Paris

Book 
 Żożo i Lulu (2010)
 Mój Paryż (2010)
 Europa w kuchni (2007)
 W 60 minut dookoła Polski (2006)

External links

 

Polish actresses
1979 births
Living people